Namdong Induspark Station is a subway station on the Korail-operated Suin Line in Namdong-gu, Incheon, which opened on June 30, 2012.

Metro stations in Incheon
Seoul Metropolitan Subway stations
Namdong District
Railway stations opened in 1937
1937 establishments in Korea